Cortinarius aerugineoconicus is a basidiomycete fungus of the genus Cortinarius native to New Zealand, where it grows under Nothofagus.

See also
List of Cortinarius species

References

External links

aerugineoconicus
Fungi of New Zealand
Fungi described in 1990
Taxa named by Egon Horak